The Honolulu Marathon (branded JAL Honolulu Marathon for sponsorship reasons) is a marathon (26.2 miles or 42.2km) in Honolulu, Hawaii, first held in 1973.  It is one of the world's largest marathons, taking place annually on the second Sunday in December. The marathon is popular for its  location in Hawaii, and is also popular among first-time marathoners, many of whom are visitors from Japan.

The 40th Honolulu Marathon, held in 2012, had 30,898 registrants, and was the second-largest marathon in the United States that year, behind the Chicago Marathon.

History 

The race began in 1973. During its formative period (1973–1978) the Honolulu Marathon doubled in size every year—a rate that has been equaled only once. That growth, like the growth of long-distance running itself, came about not from an interest in competition, but from a quest for personal longevity and an enhanced quality of life.
Former Honolulu Mayor Frank Fasi has been inducted in the Honolulu Marathon Hall of Fame after documents proved that he was the true founder of the race 40 years ago.

Mayor Fasi died in 2010.   With the Honolulu Marathon just days away, race officials say they have undisputed proof that Fasi made it all happen.

"We were clearing out some files and we saw a box labeled 1973 and we saw the documents that showed beyond a shadow of a doubt that Mayor Fasi was the creator and the founder of the marathon," said Jim Barahal, Honolulu Marathon President.

Now drawing more than 20,000 entries a year, the Honolulu Marathon is one of the biggest in the country. Back in 1973, there wasn't widespread interest in it. But Mayor Fasi knew about the Boston Marathon, and saw its potential here.
At the forefront of the growth of the Honolulu Marathon was cardiologist Jack Scaff, one of the first physicians to prescribe running as therapy for heart disease. In 1977 Sports Illustrated's senior writer and Olympic marathoner Kenny Moore wrote a feature story about the race. That article was soon followed by the book "The Honolulu Marathon," by journalist Mark Hazard Osmun; the book was a revelatory chronicle of the then-unfolding social craze called the "Running Boom," as exemplified in the Honolulu event.

Over time, the race grew and changed, luring large corporate sponsors and paying substantial prize money to the winners. In 1995, the Honolulu Marathon enjoyed the distinction of being the world's largest marathon when it drew 34,434 entrants and had 27,022 finishers.

Unique to the Honolulu Marathon among American marathons is its popularity among runners from Japan, where there are very few marathons open to all entrants.  In recent years, the majority of entrants have been visitors from Japan. The marathon is popular enough that the Honolulu Marathon Association maintains an office in Tokyo to process entries. Japan Air Lines has been the title sponsor of the race since 1985.

In 2008, 14,406 of the total 23,231 entries were from Japan, which made up nearly 62.0 percent of the field.

The 2012 Honolulu Marathon was held on Sunday, December 9, 2012. The field for the 40th Honolulu Marathon reached 30,898 entries at the marathon expo at the Hawaii Convention Center. 16,067 of those registered entrants were from Japan. The 2012 marathon was the largest in 15 years, and the second largest in America of 2012, only surpassed by the Chicago Marathon.

Organizers decided not to hold the 2020 in-person edition of the race on its original date in December due to the coronavirus pandemic, but reserved the option to postpone it to an alternate date in the first half of 2021.  All registrants were given the option of running the race virtually or transferring their entry to 2021.

Course
Starting near Ala Moana Beach Park across from Ala Moana Center, the course progresses west along the waterfront toward downtown Honolulu, then loops through downtown and bends back east through Waikiki, around Diamond Head, and out toward the eastern suburbs of Honolulu, winding through Hawaii Kai before doubling back toward the finish line at Waikiki's Kapiolani Park. Marathoners consider the course moderately difficult because of the tropical weather conditions, with temperatures starting at around 65 °F (18 °C) and rising to as high as 80 °F (27 °C), and a relatively hilly course compared with other marathons. Nevertheless, the race also remains a popular choice for first-time marathoners.

Satellite races in Iraq and Afghanistan
The Honolulu Marathon has been popular with U.S. military personnel stationed in Hawaii. With many Hawaii-based troops deployed abroad, the marathon coordinated with the military to organize satellite marathon races on U.S. bases in Iraq and Afghanistan on the same day as the main race, with finishers receiving the same T-shirts and medals. The first such race was held in 2004 at a U.S. base in Tarin Kowt, Afghanistan. In 2005, the marathon organized a similar race at Camp Victory in Baghdad.

On Dec. 12, 2010, the 43rd Sustainment Brigade, home stationed in Fort Carson, Colo., now deployed to Kandahar Air Field, Afghanistan, organized a satellite run on the base. Nearly 135 people from several different nations participated in the run.

Finishers
In recent years, on average, about 25,000 runners finish the Honolulu Marathon each year, and it has consistently placed among the world's ten largest marathons in terms of total finishers. Entry to the Honolulu Marathon is open to anyone who can pay the entry fee. Unlike other marathons of similar size, popularity, and stature, there are no qualifying standards to meet, no fixed limits on the number of runners, and no time limit to finish the course (all runners receive an official time and certificate).

Over the past 34 years, more than 585,000 runners have started the Honolulu Marathon, with over 482,000 finishers, for a finishing rate of over 82%.

Winners
Although the difficulty of the course precludes world-record pace performances, winners of the Honolulu Marathon have used it as a stepping stone to greater achievements.  For instance, three-time winner Ibrahim Hussein of Kenya later won the Boston Marathon three times; and 1993 winner Bong-Ju Lee won the silver medal and 1995 winner Josia Thugwane won the gold medal, both in the 1996 Olympic Marathon in Atlanta.

Key: Course record (in bold)

2007 winner disqualified
Ethiopian Ambesse Tolossa was disqualified as the men's champion because the U.S. Anti-Doping Agency found he had a banned substance in his system.

Deaths
2002 Grant Hirohata-Goto, 33

Timing problems in 2007
In 2007 the Marathon organizers switched from the ChampionChip timing system they had used since 2000 to a new system from SAI which utilized a smaller, lighter, chip implanted in a strip of paper.  For a myriad of reasons that are not yet entirely clear (heavy rains, improper usage, failed generators) the timing devices apparently failed to accurately record the start, split and finish times of all 24,300 participants, forcing race officials to manually review finish line video tape of all 24,000+ runners in order to confirm their correct finishing times.

Notes

References

Further reading

External links

  
Marathon Info
Account of the 2004 Honolulu Marathon satellite race in Afghanistan (PDF)
Honolulu Advertiser - report on 2005 satellite race in Iraq

Recurring sporting events established in 1973
Marathons in the United States
Sports in Honolulu
1973 establishments in Hawaii
Annual sporting events in the United States
Wheelchair marathons